Parish as a surname may refer to:

 Amy Parish (fl. 1980s–2020s), American primatologist and anthropologist
 Billy Parish (born 1981), American clean energy activist and entrepreneur
 Diane Parish (born 1969), British actress
 Don Parish (American football) (1948–2018), an American football linebacker
 Don Parish (rugby league) (born 1937), Australian rugby league footballer and coach
 Herman Parish (born 1950s), American author
 John Parish (born 1959), British musician
 John K. Parish (1848–1932), American politician and jurist
 Matthew Parish (born 1975), English lawyer
 Mitchell Parish (1900–1993), American lyricist
 Peggy Parish (1927–1988), American writer 
 Robert Parish (born 1953), American basketball player
 Sam Parish (born 1937), the eighth Chief Master Sergeant of the Air Force
 Samuel Bonsall Parish (1838–1928), American botanist
 Sarah Parish (born 1968), English actress

See also
 Parrish (surname)